St Leonards is an inner suburb of Hastings, New Zealand, in the Hawke's Bay region of New Zealand. It is named for St Leonards-on-Sea, a neighbouring town to Hastings' own English namesake.

The suburb is located immediately north and northwest of the city centre, with the city's main road, Heretaunga Street, passing through its centre.

St Leonard's Park is a sports field used for touch rugby in summer and football in winter.

Demographics

St Leonards had a population of 2,646 at the 2018 New Zealand census, an increase of 387 people (17.1%) since the 2013 census, and an increase of 423 people (19.0%) since the 2006 census. There were 954 households, comprising 1,311 males and 1,335 females, giving a sex ratio of 0.98 males per female. The median age was 35.9 years (compared with 37.4 years nationally), with 477 people (18.0%) aged under 15 years, 630 (23.8%) aged 15 to 29, 1,167 (44.1%) aged 30 to 64, and 366 (13.8%) aged 65 or older.

Ethnicities were 64.9% European/Pākehā, 25.6% Māori, 11.7% Pacific peoples, 11.6% Asian, and 1.7% other ethnicities. People may identify with more than one ethnicity.

The percentage of people born overseas was 23.8, compared with 27.1% nationally.

Although some people chose not to answer the census's question about religious affiliation, 43.4% had no religion, 39.9% were Christian, 2.9% had Māori religious beliefs, 2.0% were Hindu, 2.4% were Buddhist and 3.3% had other religions.

Of those at least 15 years old, 303 (14.0%) people had a bachelor's or higher degree, and 465 (21.4%) people had no formal qualifications. The median income was $27,100, compared with $31,800 nationally. 171 people (7.9%) earned over $70,000 compared to 17.2% nationally. The employment status of those at least 15 was that 1,134 (52.3%) people were employed full-time, 351 (16.2%) were part-time, and 84 (3.9%) were unemployed.

References

Suburbs of Hastings, New Zealand
Populated places in the Hawke's Bay Region